The ski jumping  events have been contested at the Universiade since 1960.

Events

Medalists

Men

Normal hill

Large hill

Normal hill team

Women

Normal hill

Normal hill team

Mixed

Team

Medal table 
Last updated after the 2023 Winter Universiade

References 
Sports123

 
Universiade
Sports at the Winter Universiade
Nordic skiing at the Winter Universiade